Zen at War is a book written by Brian Daizen Victoria, first published in 1997. The second edition appeared in 2006.

Contents
The book meticulously documents Zen Buddhism's support of Japanese militarism from the time of the Meiji Restoration through the World War II and the post-War period. It describes the influence of state policy on Buddhism in Japan, and particularly the influence of Zen on the military of the Empire of Japan. A famous quote is from Harada Daiun Sogaku: "[If ordered to] march: tramp, tramp, or shoot: bang, bang. This is the manifestation of the highest Wisdom [of Enlightenment]. The unity of Zen and war of which I speak extends to the farthest reaches of the holy war [now under way]."

The book also explores the actions of Japanese Buddhists who opposed the growth of militarism.

The 2002 edition of Zen at War was followed by Zen War Stories, which further explores the intimate relationship between Japanese institutional Buddhism and militarism during World War II.

Sources
Victoria draws from his own study of original Japanese documents, but also uses the publications of Ichikawa Hakugen, a Rinzai-priest and a scholar who taught at Hanazono University in Tokyo. Hakugen's work, in Japanese, include:
 1967 Zen and Contemporary Thought (Zen to Gendai Shiso)
 1970 The War Responsibility of Buddhists (Bukkyosha no Senso Sekinin)
 1975 Religion Under Japanese Fascism (Nihon Fashizumu Ka no Shukyo)
 1977 Buddhism During the War (Senji Ka no Bukkyo)

Hakugen himself had been "a strong advocate of Japan's 'holy war'": "And I should not forget to include myself as one of those modern Japanese Buddhist who did these things. "

Hakugen points to twelve characteristics of Japanese Zen which have contributed to its support for Japanese militarism:
 Subservience of Buddhism to the state.
 Buddhist views on humanity and society. Though "Buddhism emphasizes the equality of human beings based on their possession of a Buddha nature"; the doctrine of karma has also been used as a "moral justification for social inequality".
 Protection of the state and the hierarchical social structures.
 Emphasis on śūnyatā and selflessness, "leaving no room for the independence of the individual".
 Lack of Buddhist dogma, which left no "compelling basic dogma a believer would fight to preserve".
 The concept of on, "the teaching that a debt of gratitude is owed to those from whom favors are received". In the case of Japanese Zen, this gratitude was also owed to the Emperor, as "the head of the entire Japanese family".
 The belief in mutual dependency, which "led in modern Japan to an organic view of the state coupled with a feeling of intimacy towards it".
 The doctrine of the Middle Way, which "took the form of a constant search for compromise with the aim of avoiding confrontation before it occurred".
 The tradition of ancestor veneration, in which "the entire nation came to be regarded as one large family in which loyalty between subject and sovereign was the chief virtue".
 The value given to "old and mature things". Since society was based "on a set of ancient and immutable laws", opposition to this was unacceptable.
 Emphasis on inner peace, which "contributed to its failure to encourage and justify the will to reorganize society".
 The Buddhist logic of soku, "just as it is", which leads to "a static, aesthetic perspective, a detached, subjective harmony with things".

Hakugen saw D. T. Suzuki as "most responsible for the development of imperial-way Zen", but in no way standing alone in this development. Hakugen traces this development to pre-meiji developments:

Responses
The book drew a lot of attention, and mixed responses:

Robert Aitken writes:

Ton Lathouwers, Chán-teacher in the Netherlands, in relation to Zen at War mentions Hisamatsu's impossible question, "What will you do when you cannot do anything, when all your best intentions and great endeavour are invested to no avail whatsoever, when all you do is doomed to fail?", relating it to a statement by Takeo Sato:

Apologies
In response to Zen at war Ina Buitendijk started a campaign to receive apologies from leading parties within the Japanese Zen-schools: 

Her campaign resulted in responses from Kubota Ji'un, third abbot of the Sanbo Kyodan, Hirata Seiko, and Hosokawa, abbot of Myoshin-ji.

Kubota Ji'un writes:

Hirata Seiko writes:

Criticism
Brian Victoria has also been criticized.

Kemmyō Taira Sato states that Victoria's criticism of D. T. Suzuki is misplaced since he did not support Japanese militarism in his writings:

Victoria himself quotes critical remarks by Suzuki on the war and the support given to it by the Zen-institutions: "[T]hey diligently practiced the art of self-preservation through their narrow-minded focus on 'pacifying and preserving the state'."

Muhō Noelke, a German-born Zen monk in the Sōtō Zen tradition, states that Victoria has mistranslated texts from Kōdō Sawaki, who was a prominent Japanese Sōtō Zen teacher in the 20th century.

Robert Aitken, a Zen teacher in the Harada-Yasutani lineage which was criticized by Victoria for the nationalist sympathies of its patriarch Hakuun Yasutani, writes that "Unlike the other researchers, Victoria writes in a vacuum. He extracts the words and deeds of Japanese Buddhist leaders from their cultural and temporal context, and judges them from a present-day, progressive, Western point of view."

Further studies
The issues of Japanese nationalism, individualism, and the justification of social inequality have been taken up by other authors as well.

Japanese nationalism
In 1995, the Nanzan Institute for Religion and Culture published Rude Awakenings. Zen, the Kyoto School, and the question of nationalism, which "examines the relationship between Japanese nationalism and intellectuals in the Kyoto school and the world of Zen." It places the development of the Kyoto school, and its alleged support for the Japanese militarism, in the larger context of the Meiji-restoration.

Robert H. Sharf contributed to this volume, as a sequel to his The Zen of Japanese Nationalism, in which he extensively investigates the support of the Zen-institutions for the Imperial State, and the backgrounds of this support.

Nam-lin Hur has described the support of the Sōtō for the occupation of Korea in the beginning of the 20th century.

Individualism
Peek argues that individualism, contrary to popular notions, is inherently supported by Buddhism. This inherent support made it possible to effect a transmission from authoritarian imperialism to democracy:

Social inequality
The Soto-school has taken up the issue of social inequality. According to Bodiford, the Soto-school has insisted that "the types of social discrimination found in Sõtõ rituals and temple practices" find their origin in "the medieval institutional regulations imposed by the Tokugawa regime, not in the religious attitudes, religious practices, or religious mission of Sõtõ Zen itself". The Soto-school has installed a Human Rights Division, to terminate the regulations which contribute to discriminatory practices.

Enlightenment and authority
Zen at War has contributed to discussions on the meaning of "enlightenment", and the role of Zen-teachers in the emerging western Zen-Buddhism. Bodhin Kjolhede, dharma heir of Philip Kapleau, says:

Stuart Lachs has written several essays on this issue, connected to teacher-scandals in western sanghas. The issue has been taken up by others as well.

Author
The author, Brian Victoria, trained at the Sōtō monastery of Eihei-ji and is a fully ordained Sōtō priest. He received his Ph.D. in Buddhist Studies from the Department of Religion at Temple University and his M.A. from Sōtō-affiliated Komazawa University in Tokyo, where he also majored in Buddhist Studies.

Victoria has taught Japanese language and culture at the University of Nebraska Omaha, Creighton University, and Bucknell University in the United States and lectured in the Department of Asian Languages and Literatures at the University of Auckland. He was a Senior Lecturer in the Centre in Asian Studies at the University of Adelaide in South Australia. He has also been Yehan Numata Distinguished Visiting Professor, Buddhist Studies at the University of Hawaii at Manoa. From 2005 to 2013, he was a professor of Japanese Studies and director of the Antioch Education Abroad "Japan and Its Buddhist Traditions Program" at Antioch University in Yellow Springs, OH. Since 2013, he has been a Fellow at Oxford Centre for Buddhist Studies and a Visiting Research Fellow at the International Research Center for Japanese Studies.

See also
 Bushido
 Shinbutsu Bunri
 Nihonjinron
 State Shinto
 Buddhist modernism
 Buddhism and violence

Notes

Citations

Works cited

  

 Online

Further reading

 Bethel, Dayle M. "Two Views of Tsunesaburo Makiguchi's Attitude toward Japanese Militarism and Education," (The Journal of Oriental Studies (vol. 12, 2003), pp. 208)
 Daniel A. Metraux, "A Critical Analysis of Brian Victoria's Perspectives on Modern Japanese Buddhist History" (Journal of Global Buddhism)
 Miyata, Koichi, [http://www.globalbuddhism.org/3/miyata021.htm "Critical Comments on Brian Victoria's 'Engaged Buddhism: A Skeleton in the Closet?'''"] (Journal of Global Buddhism (vol. 3, 2002), pp. 79–85)
 Sato, Kemmyō Taira, "Suzuki Daisetsu no Makoto (鈴木大拙のまこと)" (Kamakura: Matsugaoka Bunko Foundation, Newsletter no. 21, 2007)
 Sato, Kemmyō Taira, (Trans. Thomas Kirchner) D. T. Suzuki and the Question of War (Kyoto: The Eastern Buddhist, Vol. 39, No.1, (New Series) 2008 )

External links
 Reviews
 Review of Zen at War by Fabio Rambelli, in the Journal of Buddhist Ethics''
 Review of Zen at War by David Loy
 "Zen Holy War?", a review by Josh Baran
 Review of Zen at War by Vladimir K, at the zensite.com

1997 in religion
1997 non-fiction books
History of Buddhism in Japan
Japanese militarism
Zen studies books